Maurice Twomey (10 June 1897 – October 1978) was an Irish republican and the longest serving chief of staff of the Irish Republican Army (IRA).

Early life

Twomey was born in 1897 in Clondulane, near Fermoy, County Cork, Ireland and was educated by the Congregation of Christian Brothers. The son of a labourer at Hallinan’s Flour Mills in the town, Twomey went to work there at the age of 14 where he rose to the position of works manager.  In 1914 he became active in the Irish Volunteers.

Character

Twomey was a dedicated and well respected Irish Republican who successfully dealt with factions within the Irish Republican movement. "He was dedicated to Irish freedom and nothing else mattered to him. Compromise was not in his vocabulary."

War of Independence

By 1918 he was adjutant of the Fermoy Battalion and a year later became an adjutant of the Cork No. 2 Brigade. He took part in an ambush of British troops in Fermoy in September 1919, one of the first attacks on British soldiers in Ireland since the 1916 Easter Rising and one of the first of the Irish War of Independence.

During 1920 he helped direct IRA intelligence in his brigade area. He was staff commandant of Liam Lynch’s 1st Southern Division when he was captured and imprisoned on Spike Island during 1921. He managed to escape from the prison by rowing boat along with Dick Barrett, Tom Crofts and Bill Quirke.

Civil War

Twomey opposed the Anglo-Irish Treaty of December 1921, although he was critical of the tactics adopted by the anti-Treaty forces headquartered in the Four Courts. He was influenced by Oscar Traynor's opinion that the garrison would destroy the Republic during June 1922. The Four Courts episode had showed the leadership that it was out of touch with the reality of the awesome power of artillery. Twomey concurred with Liam Mellows that if a government was to be formed in the interest of labour, it must be a republic.

During the Irish Civil War, Twomey became adjutant general on the staff of Liam Lynch, IRA Chief of Staff, and was with the commander when he was killed in the Knockmealdowns mountains on 10 April 1923. Twomey was imprisoned in the same month in Dublin.

IRA Chief of Staff
During 1924 he became involved in the reorganisation of the IRA, inspecting its southern divisions that summer and its northern units during 1925. First elected onto the IRA Executive at the November 1925 IRA General Army Convention, he became a full-time IRA activist. He disguised this by describing his profession as "journalist", justified somewhat by his regular contributions to the IRA weekly newspaper, An Phoblacht. During 1926 he was acting IRA chief of staff in the absence of Andrew Cooney, and in 1927, he was confirmed in that position.

In the summer of 1925, the anti-treaty IRA had sent a delegation led by Pa Murray to the Soviet Union for a personal meeting with Joseph Stalin, in the hopes of gaining Soviet finance and weaponry assistance. A secret pact was agreed where the IRA would spy on the United States and the United Kingdom and pass information to Red Army military intelligence (GRU) spymasters in New York City and London in return for £500 a month. The pact was originally approved by Frank Aiken, who left soon after, before being succeeded by Cooney and Twomey who kept up the secret espionage relationship.

Twomey was not himself an ideological Marxist-Leninist (though there were some communists in the IRA at this time such as Peadar O'Donnell), he saw the arrangement purely as a means to gain the IRA badly needed funding. Twomey also repeatedly accused the Soviets of being "shifty" and "out to exploit us." Nevertheless, London-based IRA spymaster Seán MacBride passed specifications of "submarine detection sonar and aeroplane engines for bombers, military journals and manuals, and gas masks" to the USSR through Berlin-based GRU operative Walter Krivitsky, whom ciphered IRA communications referred to only by the code name "James". Meanwhile, the IRA's main spymaster in America "Mr. Jones", whom historians Tom Mahon and James J. Gillogly have identified as Daniel "Sandow" O'Donovan, passed "reports of the army’s chemical weapons service, state-of-the-art gas masks, machine-gun and aeroplane engine specifications, and reports from the navy, air service and army" to the Soviet GRU.

Twomey was considered a Socialist, albeit one who put practicality before ideology. Twomey considered himself a moderate, had a deep sense of history, and the belief that Ireland had the resources to provide a good living for all of its people.  His policy as chief of staff was to allow individual members of the IRA to join left-wing groups, but not to let the IRA itself become attached to any political party. He simultaneously feared undermining support for Fianna Fáil and thus handing power back to Cumann na nGaedheal; but he was also apprehensive about the IRA being seen as attached to Fianna Fáil.

In 1930, Twomey married Kathleen MacLaughlin of Donegal and had two children in the early 1930s.

Saor Eire and Fianna Fáil

In 1931 Twomey tried to quell different factions within the IRA (those seeking to establish a social programme vs those against it) by permitting IRA members to create Saor Eire, a far-left political party. However, Saor Eire quickly found itself under attack from both Cumann na nGaedheal and by the Catholic Church in Ireland for being a Pro-Soviet organisation, with the IRA painted as guilty by association. Simultaneously, the Cumann na nGaedhael government gave itself emergency powers and began arresting IRA members. Both Twomey and the IRA decided that in order to hold off Cumann na nGaedheal, they would need to rally around Fianna Fáil.

In February 1932 Cumann na nGaedhael called a snap election, hoping to catch both the IRA and Fianna Fáil on the backfoot. However, Fianna Fáil were able to secure victory. To the surprise of many, Cumann na nGaedhael choose to respect the result of the vote and stood aside to let Fianna Fáil into power. Initially, many Republicans and members of the IRA were overjoyed with the result. At first Fianna Fail seem to signal goodwill to the IRA by releasing many IRA prisoners. However, it quickly dawned upon the IRA that Fianna Fáil were not going to declare a Republic, and this put them in an awkward spot. A week after Fianna Fáil came to power, an internal document produced by the IRA leadership asked two fundamental questions: "can Fianna Fáil’s methods and policies achieve the Republic?", to which they answered No, and "can the IRA launch a successful revolution against the Fianna Fáil Government?", to which they also answered No. Both Twomey and the IRA were unsure how to proceed. In Twomey's own words "nobody had visualised a Free State which Republicans were not supposed to attack".

Following the election of Fianna Fáil, Tom Barry and Twomey clashed over the direction going forward. Barry wished to see Saor Eire ended (believing its policies never gain mass support, and in fact, this made Saor Eire an undemocratic concept) and for the IRA to reconcile with Fianna Fáil. Twomey instead thought that the social programme of Saor Eire could and would gain democratic support.

On 21 May 1936 Twomey was arrested in his house in Dublin under Article 2A of the Irish Constitution. On 18 June 1936 the Fianna Fáil government banned the IRA. The following day Twomey was tried and jailed for three years for membership of the newly proscribed organisation. Under the IRA constitution, his tenure as IRA chief of staff ended automatically upon his arrest. He was imprisoned in Arbour Hill Prison and the Curragh from 1936 to 1938. During his period of imprisonment his family depended heavily on money sent to them by Joseph McGarrity of Clan na Gael, a US-based IRA fundraising organisation. On his release, Twomey became adjutant general on Seán Russell's army council. He travelled to Britain and inspected the IRA's units there. Twomey concluded that the IRA was in no position to launch a campaign and withdrew from IRA activity. In 1939 he opened a newsagents and confectioners in Dublin's O'Connell Street.

Post IRA life

Following a crackdown on the IRA by Éamon de Valera's government, he was interned for two weeks during 1940. He remained close to the IRA, giving assistance to republicans deported from Britain and mediating in disputes between IRA factions. While he did not take an active role in politics after the 1940s, he did speak at a number of republican commemorations, most notably at the restoration of Wolfe Tone's grave at Bodenstown in 1971. He never claimed an IRA pension from the Irish government or gave an account of his record to the Bureau of Military History, set up to record the recollections of participants involved in the struggle against British rule.

He was badly injured in an accident in 1971 and was deeply affected by the death of his wife Kathleen Twomey in April 1978. Twomey himself died in October of that year. The presence at his funeral of members of Fianna Fáil and Fine Gael, Sinn Féin The Workers’ Party and Provisional Sinn Féin, the Irish labour movement and old IRA comrades from the 1930s was evidence of his enduring popularity.

Twomey's papers from his period as IRA chief of staff, consisting of 28 boxes, are now kept at the Archives Department of University College Dublin.

References

Bibliography

 Dalton, Charles, With the Dublin Brigade 1917-1921 (London 1929)
 English, Richard, 'Green on Red: Two Case Studies in Early Twentieth-Century Irish Republican Thought', in D George Boyce et al. (eds.), Political Thought in Ireland since the Seventeenth Century (London 1993)
 English, Richard, Ernie O'Malley: IRA Intellectual (Oxford 1998)
 English, Richard & Graham Walker (eds.), Prisoners: The Civil War Letters of Ernie O'Malley (Swords 1991)
 Greaves, C Desmond, Liam Mellows and the Irish Revolution (London 1971)
 Hanley, Brian The IRA. 1926-1936, Dublin (Four Courts Press 2002). 
 Williams, T.Desmond (ed.), The Irish Struggle 1916-1926 (London 1966)

1897 births
1978 deaths
People from County Cork
Irish Republican Army (1919–1922) members
Irish Republican Army (1922–1969) members
Irish spies for the Soviet Union
People of the Irish Civil War (Anti-Treaty side)
People from Fermoy
Spymasters